David Marc Worden (born June 5, 1976) is a Canadian actor.

Biography
David Marc Worden (commonly known as Marc), attended Churchill Heights Public School in Scarborough, Ontario from grades 4 through 8. He was a student in the gifted program.  He made his first known stage appearance as Sandy the dog in the school's musical production of Annie in 1986.

Worden started his career in Toronto, Ontario, Canada, in television and theater. In 1990, he relocated to the US to work for the Walt Disney Company and has remained there ever since.

Following community theatre performances in the Toronto Civic Light-Opera Company's productions of The King and I and The Wizard of Oz, as well as taking dance and musical theatre classes with Roland and Romaine Studios in Toronto, he made film appearances on two episodes of the television series Katts and Dog. He was a cast member for 5 seasons on the Disney Channel's The All New Mickey Mouse Club from 1990 to 1994. In 1997, Worden appeared in two episodes of season six of the series Star Trek: Deep Space Nine, the last of four actors (starting with a 1990 episode of Star Trek: The Next Generation) to portray the character of Alexander Rozhenko, the (now adult, as portrayed by Worden) son of Worf.

In addition to onscreen appearances on film and television, Worden has done extensive voice work on animated series and films, starting with the Batman Beyond franchise in 1999, as well as numerous video games, starting with Blade Runner in 1997.

Personal life
He currently resides in Los Angeles, California, where he continues his career as an on-camera actor and voice-over artist. He is married to Mari, and together they have three sons Nathan, Aidan and Ryder.

Filmography

Film

Television

Video games

References

External links

1976 births
Canadian male child actors
Canadian male film actors
Canadian male television actors
Canadian male voice actors
Living people
Mouseketeers
Male actors from Toronto
Musicians from Toronto
21st-century American singers